This is a list of critical theorists.

A
 Theodor Adorno
 Karl-Otto Apel
 Michael Apple

B
 Gad Barzilai	
 Jean Baudrillard 
 Zygmunt Bauman
 Regina Becker-Schmidt
 Walter Benjamin	
 Lauren Berlant
 Michael Betancourt
 Susan Bordo
 Stephen Bronner
 Wendy Brown

C
 Cornelius Castoriadis
 Wendy Hui Kyong Chun
 Hélène Cixous
 Dana L. Cloud
 Joan Copjec
 Robert W. Cox

D
 Angela Davis
 Hamid Dabashi
 Antonia Darder
 Michel de Certeau
 Manuel DeLanda
 Teresa de Lauretis
 James Der Derian
 Enrique Dussel

E
 Antony Easthope
 Mikhail Epstein

F
 Norman Fairclough	 
 Andrew Feenberg
 Paul Feyerabend	
 Shulamith Firestone
 Mark Fisher (theorist)
 Ramon Flecha
 Nancy Fraser
 Paulo Freire
 Erich Fromm

G
 Hans-Georg Gadamer
 Raymond Geuss
 Henry Giroux
 Antonio Gramsci
 Stephen Greenblatt
 Félix Guattari

H
 Jürgen Habermas
 Byung-Chul Han
 Stuart Hall
 David Halperin
 Donna Haraway
 Michael Hardt
 David Harvey
 Alamgir Hashmi
 Axel Honneth
 bell hooks
 Max Horkheimer

I
 Luce Irigaray

J
 Fredric Jameson
 Anselm Jappe
 Henry Jenkins
 Sut Jhally

K
 Kojin Karatani
 Douglas Kellner
 Joe L. Kincheloe
 Otto Kirchheimer
 Siegfried Kracauer
 Julia Kristeva
 Robert Kurz

L
 Ernesto Laclau
 Edgardo Lander
 Bruno Latour
 Henri Lefebvre
 Alfred Lorenzer
 Leo Löwenthal
 Timothy Luke

M
 Herbert Marcuse	 
 Peter McLaren
 Walter Mignolo
 Timothy Morton
 Chantal Mouffe
 Laura Mulvey

N
 Antonio Negri
 Oskar Negt
 Franz L. Neumann
 Martha Nussbaum

O
 Claus Offe

P
 Friedrich Pollock
 Nicos Poulantzas
 Paul B. Preciado
 Moishe Postone
 Jasbir Puar

R
 Jacques Rancière
 Wilhelm Reich
 Gillian Rose
 Georg Rusche

S
 Modjtaba Sadria
 Edward Said
 Eve Kosofsky Sedgwick
 Ljubodrag Simonović
 Barbara Herrnstein Smith
 Ferdinand de Saussure

T
 Trinh T. Minh-ha

V
 Alfonso Valenzuela-Aguilera
 Raoul Vaneigem
 Paul Virilio

W
 McKenzie Wark
 Simone Weil
 Cornel West
 Frank B. Wilderson III
 Raymond Williams

Y
 Gene Youngblood

Z
 Slavoj Žižek

See also
 Frankfurt School

 
Critical theorists
Critical theorists

zh:批判理論#批判思想家列表